John Wayman Stanley (May 9, 1905 – January 1, 1959), nicknamed "Neck", was an American Negro league pitcher from the 1920s to the 1940s.

A native of Kent County, Maryland, Stanley attended Chester High School in Chester, Pennsylvania. He spent over 20 years in the Negro leagues, making his debut in 1928 with the Bacharach Giants and Hilldale Club, and spending the majority of his career with the New York Black Yankees. In 1936, he tossed a no-hitter for the New York Cubans against the Newark Eagles at Delano-Hitch Stadium. He was part of another no-hitter against Newark in 1948, as he combined with Albert Stephens to hold the Eagles hitless for the Black Yankees at Red Wing Stadium. Stanley died in New York, New York in 1959 at age 53.

References

External links
 and Baseball-Reference Black Baseball stats and Seamheads

1905 births
1959 deaths
Bacharach Giants players
Baltimore Black Sox players
Brooklyn Royal Giants players
Hilldale Club players
Lincoln Giants players
New York Black Yankees players
New York Cubans players
Baseball pitchers
Baseball players from Maryland
People from Kent County, Maryland
20th-century African-American sportspeople